A referendum on employment protection was held in Switzerland on 17 February 1924. Voters were asked whether they approved of an amendment to the federal employment protection law. The proposal was rejected by 57.6% of voters.

Background
The referendum was an optional referendum, which only a majority of the vote, as opposed to the mandatory referendums, which required a double majority; a majority of the popular vote and majority of the cantons.

Results

References

1924 referendums
1924 in Switzerland
Referendums in Switzerland